The Department of Government Services (DGS) is a government department in Victoria, Australia.
 It was formed on 1 January 2023 as a result of a cabinet reshuffle by Premier of Victoria Daniel Andrews.

Upon establishment, the department took over the responsibilities for local government from the Department of Jobs, Precincts and Regions.

Ministers
, the department supports three ministers in the following portfolios:

Responsibilities
The department encompasses various functions such as consumer affairs, municipal government and administration for the public service such as grants management.

References

External links

Government departments of Victoria (Australia)
Government agencies established in 2023
2023 establishments in Australia